Tetrasodium tris(bathophenanthroline disulfonate)ruthenium(II) (Na4Ru(bps)3) is a sodium salt of coordination compound. In this form, it is the salt of a sulfonic acid. This compound is an extension of the phenanthroline series of coordination compounds. Ruthenium(II) tris(bathophenanthroline disulfonate), referring to the anionic fragment, is used as a protein dye in biochemistry for differentiating and detecting different proteins in laboratory settings.

In recent years, 2-D electrophoresis has been widely accepted as a standard procedure to separate complex protein mixtures in proteome studies (Proteomics). Protein visualisation by Ruthenium(II) tris(bathophenthroline disulfonate) has become a firmly established and widely used method in proteomic analysis and a crucial step in gene expression profiling.

For protein detection, it is advantageous to use fluorescent labels containing chromophores which have longer excitation wavelength and emission wavelength than the aromatic amino acids. The dyes used for this important step should combine attributes like good signal to background ratio (contrast), broad linear dynamic range, broad application range, photochemical stability and compatibility to protein identification techniques, e.g. mass spectrometry (MS) or Western blotting.

Originally, the ruthenium transition metal complex, ruthenium(II) tris(4,7-diphenyl-1,10-phenanthroline disulfonate)  also termed as ruthenium(II) tris(bathophentroline disulfonate) (RuBPS) was synthesized by Bannwarth  as a precursor molecule for a dye that was used as a non-radioactive label for oligo nucleotides. Later, Rabilloud et al. used RuBPS as a fluorescent label for protein detection in polyacrylamide gels. The fact that RuBPS is not only easy to synthesize but also easy to handle, induced further developments in this field.

Lamanda et al. improved the RuBPS staining protocol by selectively destaining the polyacrylamide matrix while the protein content remained tinctured. This new technique entailed a variety of advantages like strong signals, ameliorated signal to background ratio, better linearity and advanced baseline resolution.

References

External links
More information about ruthenium(II) tris(bathophenanthroline disulfonate) staining can be found on 

Ruthenium complexes
Fluorescent dyes
Ruthenium(II) compounds
Pyridine complexes
Sulfonic acids
Organic sodium salts